Tomas Arthwr Davies (born 24 March 1986) is a rugby union player. A prop forward, he played club rugby for Doncaster Knights from 2005 to 2015, having previously played for Cardiff Blues. Davies qualifies for Wales as both his parents were born in Aberdare and he represented Wales at Under 18 level and Yorkshire Under 20s. He has also played for the Barbarians.

He retired from professional rugby in 2015 for a career in chemical engineering, following a degree in that subject at the University of Sheffield.

References

External links
 Cardiff Blues profile

1986 births
Living people
Alumni of the University of Sheffield
Barbarian F.C. players
Cardiff Rugby players
English rugby union players
Rugby union players from Doncaster
Rugby union props